Jonair is a Swedish airline founded in 1973. The company has operated the Luleå-Pajala route since March 2015 and since October 2019 Umeå-Östersund and Sveg-Arlanda. In addition, the company also operates air taxis and since 2017 scenic helicopter flights in cooperation with Kallax flyg.

Destinations
This is a list of destinations operated by Jonair:

Fleet

References

External links

Note that tickets can be bought from the Jonair website but not from travel agent websites, since Jonair has no IATA code and is not connected to the travel agency ticket systems.

Airlines of Sweden
Airlines established in 1973
1973 establishments in Sweden
Umeå
Companies based in Västerbotten County